São José do Inhacorá is a municipality in the state of Rio Grande do Sul, Brazil. Originally, this little city was a district of Três de Maio and obtained its emancipation in 1992.

The city is considered the less dangerous in Brazil to live, and it shares this status with Borá. Violence is virtually eradicated (0 deaths per 100 thousand inhabitants).

See also
List of municipalities in Rio Grande do Sul

References

Municipalities in Rio Grande do Sul